Daniel Lima (born 3 May 1980 in Brasilia) is a Brazilian-Australian professional mixed martial artist. He holds record of 8-4-2. He is currently living on the Gold Coast, QLD, Australia.

Biography

Daniel Lima was born on 28 December 1980, in Brasilia, Brazil. Growing up, he always had interest in Martial Arts, especially the native martial arts of Brazil; Capoeira and Jiu Jitsu. At the age of 15, Daniel decided to focus all his energy into Brazilian jiu-jitsu. Daniel soon made a name for himself as a strong competitor, winning competitions and titles all over the world in both Brazilian jiu-jitsu and Mixed Martial Arts. These titles include winning the National title in Brazil, the North American Grappling Association title in the United States and the XFC mixed martial arts title in Australia. Daniel has also competed in Japan, New Zealand and the Philippines, and has been ranked number two in the world by the Shooto Association which is the oldest mixed martial arts association in the world. Some major titles he holds are, Brazilian jiu-jitsu National Champion, North American Submission Wrestling Champion and X.F.C Australian Champion.

BJJ
Lima is the Head coach of Fight Club BJJ on the Gold Coast (Miami) in Queensland, Australia. Over the years his teaching ability has grown with his reputation. Together in Brazil, he and Marcio Bittencourt combined their teams to form Fight Club Jiu-Jitsu, which became one of the strongest teams in Bahia, Brazil. From there, Marcio continued to grow and strengthen the team in Brazil while Daniel took Fight Club Jiu-Jitsu around the world. He taught in the US, New Zealand and finally Australia in 2003. He has expanded Fight Club Jiu-Jitsu into a diverse and fast growing organisation in various locations throughout his new home of Australia. He has led Fight Club Jiu-Jitsu to win many championships, including producing world champions of Brazilian jiu-jitsu and international level mixed martial arts fighters. He has also promoted several people to Black Belt in BJJ.

Daniel Lima also has extensive qualifications in the Martial Arts and Sporting areas including Cert II Sport & Recreation, Cert III Sport & Recreation, Cert IV Sport & Recreation, Cert III Fitness, Cert IV Fitness, Cert IV Assessment in Workplace Training, Diploma in Sports Coaching and Advanced Diploma in Sports Recreation, Defensive Tactics Instructor, Dynamic Simulation Instructor, Spontaneous Knife Defence Instructor, Senior First Aid Certificate and Working with Children Blue Card.

Mixed martial arts record

|-
| Loss
| align=center| 8-4-2
| Seiji Otsuka 
| Decision (split)
| Nitro MMA
| 
| align=center| 3
| align=center| 5:00
| align=center| Cleveland/QLD, Australia
| 
| 
|-
| Win
| align=center| 8-3-2
| Kenji Osawa 
| Decision (split)
| Shooto: Back To Our Roots 5
| 
| align=center| 3
| align=center| 5:00  
| align=center| Tokyo, Japan
| 
|-
| Win
| align=center| 7-3-2
| Albert Manners 
| Decision
| Warriors Realm: Warriors Realm 10
| 
| align=center| 3
| align=center| 5:00  
| align=center| Southport/QLD, Australia
| 
|-
| Win
| align=center| 6-3-2
| Ayumu Shioda 
| Decision (unanimous)
| Warriors Realm: Warriors Realm 9
| 
| align=center| 3
| align=center| 5:00  
| align+center| Southport/QLD, Australia
| 
|-
| Loss
| align=center| 5-3-2
| Yasuhiro Urushitani 
| Decision (unanimous)
| MARS: MARS World Grand Prix
| 
| align=center| 2
| align=center| 5:00  
| 
| 
|-
| Win
| align=center| 5-2-2
| Joe Lira 
| Submission (armbar)
| X: plosion: X-plosion 13
| 
| align=center| 1
| align=center| N/A 
| align=center| Brisbane/QLD, Australia
| 
|-
|  Draw
| align=center| 4-2-2
| Kenji Osawa 
| Draw
| Shooto 2005: 11/6 in Korakuen Hall
| 
| align=center| 3
| align=center| 5:00  
| 
| 
|-
|  Draw
| align=center| 4-2-1
| Akitoshi Hokazono 
| Draw
| Shooto 2004: 10/17 in Osaka Prefectural Gymnasium
| 
| align=center| 3
| align=center| 5:00  
| 
| 
|-
| Loss
| align=center| 4-2
| Ryoto Matsune
| Decision (unanimous) 
| Shooto: Shooto Junkie is Back!
| 
| align=center| 3
| align=center| 5:00  
| 
| 
|-
| Win
| align=center| 4-1
| Jamie Ballard 
| Submission (armbar) 
| Shooto: Australia: NHB
| 
| align=center| 1
| align=center| N/A
| 
| 
|-
| Loss
| align=center| 3-1
| Eben Kaneshiro
| Decision (unanimous)
| Fearless 2: Bad Blood
| 
| align=center| 3
| align=center| 5:00
| Pasig, Philippines
| 
|-
| Win
| align=center| 3-0
| Ben Manderson
| Submission (guillotine choke)
| Xtreme Fighting Championships 2
| 
| align=center| 1
| align=center| 0:49
| Queensland, Australia
| 
|-
| Win
| align=center| 2-0
| Stephen Gillinder
| Submission (triangle choke)
| Xtreme Fighting Championships 1
| 
| align=center| 1
| align=center| 1:18
| Queensland, Australia
|

References

External links
 
 
 Fight Club Jiu-Jitsu

Australian practitioners of Brazilian jiu-jitsu
Brazilian practitioners of Brazilian jiu-jitsu
Australian Muay Thai practitioners
Brazilian Muay Thai practitioners
Australian male mixed martial artists
Brazilian male mixed martial artists
Bantamweight mixed martial artists
Living people
1980 births
Mixed martial artists from the Gold Coast
People awarded a black belt in Brazilian jiu-jitsu
Mixed martial artists utilizing Brazilian jiu-jitsu
Mixed martial artists utilizing wrestling
Mixed martial artists utilizing Muay Thai